Tomoki Kameda (born July 12, 1991) is a Japanese professional boxer. He is a former WBO bantamweight champion, having held the title from 2013 to 2014, and former WBC super bantamweight title challenger, having fought for the title in 2019.

Personal life
Tomoki Kameda grew up in a tough area of Osaka, Japan. Tomoki is the brother of Kōki Kameda and Daiki Kameda. Their father, Shiro, dreamt that all three sons would grow up to win world titles in boxing.

At the age of 15, Tomoki Kameda relocated to Mexico in order to learn from Mexican boxing experts. He is fluent in Spanish.

Nickname
It denotes "The Ultimate Weapon of the Kamedas". He later gained a Spanish nickname El Mexicanito which translates to "The Little Mexican", since he also trains and fights out of Mexico. He has started to earn the respect of Mexican boxing fans, due to his very aggressive style of fighting.

Amateur career
Kameda had been training for the Beijing Olympics and ran his record to 35-1-1 in Japan. After his move to Mexico, he competed in the Guantes de Oro de México. However, he was too young to participate at the Olympic qualifiers. Instead of waiting, Kameda chose to turn pro.

Professional career

WBO bantamweight champion
Kameda made his professional debut against Alejandro Moreno on November 21, 2008, and won the fight by a second-round knockout. He amassed an 27–0 record during the next year, before challenging for the WBO bantamweight title. On May 30, 2013, it was announced that Kameda would challenge the undefeated reigning WBO bantamweight champion Paulus Ambunda. The bantamweight title bout was scheduled as the main event of an August 1, 2013 card that took place at the Waterfront Cebu City Hotel & Casino in Cebu City, Philippines. Despite coming into the fight as an underdog, Kameda won the fight by unanimous decision, with scores of 118–110, 116–112 and 117–111. Kameda made history as the first Japanese boxer to win a WBO title.

Kameda faced another Namibian in his first title defense, as he was booked to face the undefeated Immanuel Naidjala. The bout was scheduled for the undercard of the Liborio Solis and Daiki Kameda unified super flyweight title fight, which took place on December 3, 2013, at the Bodymaker Colosseum in Osaka, Osaka. Kameda retained the belt by unanimous decision, with scores of 117–111, 118–110 and 119–109. Kameda was booked to make his second title defense against the former two-time WBO bantamweight titleholder Pungluang Sor Singyu. The fight was scheduled for the undercard of the Canelo Alvarez and Erislandy Lara middleweight bout, which took place on July 12, 2014, at the MGM Grand Las Vegas in Paradise, Nevada. This bout represented Kameda's United States and Showtime debut. Kameda won the fight by a seventh-round technical knockout. He sent Singyu to the canvas with a left hook to the liver, which left the former champion unable to beat the ten-count. The scores at the time of the stoppage were 58–56 for Kameda, 58–56 for Singyu and 57–57. Kameda made his third and final WBO bantamweight title defense against Alejandro Hernández on November 1, 2014, at the Credit Union 1 Arena in Chicago, Illinois. The bout was organized by Hernández's promoters Warriors Boxing, who won the purse bid with an offer of $603 000. Kameda was entitled to an 80% split of the purse, i.e. $482 400, while Hernández earned $120 600. Kameda won the fight by split decision. Two judges awarded him a 115–113 scorecard, while the third judge gave the same scorecard to Hernández.

After beating Hernández, Kameda requested to face the WBA (Regular) bantamweight champion Jamie McDonnell in a title unification bout. This request was rejected by the WBO, as McDonnell was only the WBA "regular" champion, which was considered a secondary title by the organization. Kameda reacted to this by vacating the title on April 23, 2015, stating: "I have decided to relinquish my WBO belt. My main focus is to fight the best fighters in the world regardless of titles. Mcdonnell is a top fighter at 118 pounds and it was my wish to face him. I respect the WBO's decision to not sanction the fight and thank them for the opportunity to be their world champion". Kameda was booked to challenge McDonnell on May 1, 2015. Although he entered the bout as the favorite, Kameda lost the fight by a close unanimous decision. All three judges scored the fight 114–113 for McDonnell. The pair was scheduled to fight an immediate rematch on September 6, 2015. McDonnel once again won the fight by unanimous decision, this time in a more convincing fashion, with scores of 115–112, 116–111 and 117–110.

Super bantamweight
After suffering the first two losses of his professional career, Kameda moved up in weight to super bantamweight, and was booked to face Edgar Martinez on October 15, 2016. He won the fight by a first-round knockout. Kameda next faced Mike Rawatchai on March 10, 2017, in his first fight in Japan since December 2013. He won the fight by unanimous decision, with scores of 100–88, 100–90 and 99–90. Four months later, on July 10, 2017, Kameda faced the one-time IBF bantamweight title challenger Iván Morales. He won the fight by unanimous decision, with scores of 100–90, 100–90 and 99–91. Kameda was booked to face Daniel Noriega on May 5, 2018. He won the fight by unanimous decision, with all three judges scoring the fight 100–88 in his favor.

Kameda was booked to challenge the reigning WBC interim super bantamweight titleholder Abigail Medina on November 12, 2018. The title bout was scheduled as the main event of an Abema TV broadcast card that took place at the Korakuen Hall in Tokyo, Japan. Abema TV broadcast the fight live and exclusively on the internet, which was the first time that a world boxing championship in Japan was broadcast in such a way. Kameda won the fight by unanimous decision. Two of the judges scored the fight 117–111 in his favor, while the third judge awarded him a 116–112 scorecard. The fight peaked at 2.2 million viewers.

Winning the interim title placed Kameda at the front of the line to challenge the reigning champion Rey Vargas. The fight was officially confirmed on June 6, 2019, to take place at the Dignity Health Sports Park in Carson, California on July 13, 2019. The bout was broadcast by DAZN. Vargas justified his role as the betting favorite, as he won the fight by unanimous decision. All three judges scored the fight 117–110 for Vargas. Kameda was out-landed 173 to 133 in total punches, but only 122 to 120 in power punches.

Featherweight
Kameda returned to boxing following a 22-month absence from the sport to face Hironori Miyake. The bout was booked for May 22, 2021, and took place at the 176BOX in Toyonaka, Japan. He won the fight by unanimous decision, with scores of 79–73, 78–73, and 78–73. After successfully bouncing back from his third professional loss, Kameda was scheduled to face Yonfrez Parejo in a WBA super bantamweight title eliminator. He earned the status of mandatory challenger by beating Parejo by unanimous decision, with scores of 118–110, 117–111 and 116–112.

On April 22, 2022, Kameda announced he had begun to train at the TRYBOX Heisei Nishiyama. Kameda was booked to face William Encarnación on July 30, 2022, at the Kobe Municipal Central Gymnasium in Kobe, Japan. Kameda won the fight by a fourth-round knockout.

Kameda is scheduled to face Luis Castillo in a stay-busy fight on February 25, 2023, at the ATC Hall in Osaka, Japan.

Professional boxing record

{|class="wikitable" style="text-align:center"
|-
!
!Result
!Record
!Opponent
!Type
!Round, time
!Date
!Location
!Notes
|- align=center
|43
|Win
|40–3
|align=left|Luis Castillo
|TKO
|5 (10), 
|Feb 25, 2023
|align=left|
|align=left|
|- align=center
|42
|Win
|39–3
|align=left|William Encarnación
|KO
|4 (10), 
|Jul 30, 2022
|align=left|
|align=left|
|- align=center
|41
|Win
|38–3
|align=left|Yonfrez Parejo
|UD
|12
|Dec 11, 2021
|align=left|
|align=left|
|- align=center
|40
|Win
|37–3
|align=left|Hironori Miyake
|UD
|8
|May 22, 2021
|align=left|
|align=left|
|- align=center
|39
|Loss
|36–3
|align=left|Rey Vargas
|UD
|12
|Jul 13, 2019
|align=left|
|align=left|
|- align=center
|38
|Win
|36–2
|align=left|Abigail Medina
|UD
|12
|Nov 12, 2018
|align=left|
|align=left|
|- align=center
|37
|Win
|35–2
|align=left|Daniel Noriega
|UD
|10
|May 5, 2018
|align=left|
|align=left|
|- align=center
|36
|Win
|34–2
|align=left|Iván Morales
|UD
|10
|Jul 10, 2017	
|align=left|
|align=left|
|- align=center
|35
|Win
|33–2
|align=left|Mike Rawatchai
|UD
|10
|Mar 10, 2017
|align=left|
|align=left|
|- align=center
|34
|Win
|32–2
|align=left|Edgar Martinez
|KO
|1 (10), 
|Oct 15, 2016
|align=left|
|align=left|
|- align=center
|33
|Loss || 31–2 || align=left|Jamie McDonnell
|UD
|12
|Sep 6, 2015 ||align=left|
|align=left|
|- align=center
|32
|Loss || 31–1 ||align=left|Jamie McDonnell
|UD 
|12 || May 9, 2015 ||align=left|
|align=left|
|- align=center
|31
|Win || 31–0 ||align=left|Alejandro Hernández
|SD 
|12 || Nov 1, 2014 ||align=left|
|align=left|
|- align=center
|30
|Win || 30–0 ||align=left|Pungluang Sor Singyu
|TKO
|7 (12),  || Jul 12, 2014 ||align=left|
|align=left|
|- align=center
|29
|Win || 29–0 ||align=left|Immanuel Naidjala
|UD 
|12 || Dec 3, 2013 ||align=left|
|align=left|
|- align=center
|28
|Win || 28–0 ||align=left|Paulus Ambunda
|UD 
|12 || Aug 1, 2013 ||align=left|
|align=left|
|- align=center
|27
|Win || 27–0 ||align=left|Nouldy Manakane
|KO 
|6 (10),  || Mar 9, 2013 ||align=left|
|align=left|
|- align=center
|26
|Win || 26–0 ||align=left|Rey Las Pinas
|KO
|4 (10),  || Dec 4, 2012 ||align=left|
|align=left|
|- align=center
|25
|Win || 25–0 ||align=left|Javier Franco
|TKO 
|5 (10),  || Oct 27, 2012 ||align=left|
|align=left|
|- align=center
|24
|Win || 24–0 ||align=left|Monico Laurente
|UD 
|10 || Aug 19, 2012 ||align=left|
|align=left|
|- align=center
|23
|Win || 23–0 ||align=left|Jairo Hernandez
|RTD 
|10 (12),  || Apr 26, 2012 ||align=left|
|align=left|
|- align=center
|22
|Win || 22–0 ||align=left|Eduardo García
|KO
|7 (10),  || Dec 7, 2011 ||align=left|
|align=left|
|- align=center
|21
|Win || 21–0 ||align=left|Jesús Ceja
|TKO
|7 (10),  || Oct 15, 2011 ||align=left|
|align=left|
|- align=center
|20
|Win || 20–0 ||align=left|Dandy Toei
|UD 
|10 || Jul 8, 2011 ||align=left|
|align=left|
|- align=center
|19
|Win || 19–0 ||align=left|Nathan Bolcio
|UD 
|10|| May 7, 2011 ||align=left|
|align=left|
|- align=center
|18
|Win || 18–0 ||align=left|Germán Meraz
|UD 
|12 || Feb 19, 2011 ||align=left|
|align=left|
|- align=center
|17
|Win || 17–0 ||align=left|Pichitchai Twins Gym
|KO 
|3 (10),  || Dec 26, 2010 ||align=left|
|align=left|
|- align=center
|16
|Win || 16–0 ||align=left|Stephane Jamoye
|SD 
|10 || Aug 28, 2010 ||align=left|
|align=left|
|- align=center
|15
|Win || 15–0 ||align=left|Arturo Camargo
|UD 
|10 || Jul 10, 2010 ||align=left|
|align=left|
|- align=center
|14
|Win || 14–0 ||align=left|Javier Rodríguez 
|UD 
|10|| May 29, 2010 ||align=left|
|align=left|
|- align=center
|13
|Win || 13–0 ||align=left|Narciso Lara
|TKO
|3 (10),  || Apr 30, 2010 ||align=left|
|align=left|
|- align=center
|12
|Win || 12–0 ||align=left|Rodolfo Garay
|KO
|3 (10),  || Jan 16, 2010 ||align=left|
|align=left|
|- align=center
|11
|Win || 11–0 ||align=left|Marlon Márquez
|UD 
|10 || Nov 27, 2009 ||align=left|
|align=left|
|- align=center
|10
|Win || 10–0 ||align=left|Jesus Periban
|TKO 
|3 (8),  || Sep 5, 2009 ||align=left|
|align=left|
|- align=center
|9
|Win || 9–0 ||align=left|Marco Antonio Chable
|TKO 
|4 (6),  || Aug 6, 2009 ||align=left|
|align=left|
|- align=center
|8
|Win || 8–0 ||align=left|Alejandro Dotor
|TKO
|3 (6),  || Jun 26, 2009 ||align=left|
|align=left|
|- align=center
|7
|Win || 7–0 ||align=left|Tatsuhiro Kumobayashi
|TKO
|4 (6),  || May 30, 2009 ||align=left|
|align=left|
|- align=center
|6
|Win || 6–0 ||align=left|Alain Lopez
|UD
|4 || Apr 11, 2009 ||align=left|
|align=left|
|- align=center
|5
|Win || 5–0 ||align=left|Andres Torres
|TKO
|2 (4),  || Mar 14, 2009 ||align=left|
|align=left|
|- align=center
|4
|Win || 4–0 ||align=left|Arturo Delgado
|TKO
|2 (4),  || Feb 6, 2009 ||align=left|
|align=left|
|- align=center
|3
|Win || 3–0 ||align=left|Juan Carlos Olvera
|TKO 
|3 (4),  || Mar 28, 2009 ||align=left|
|align=left|
|- align=center
|2
|Win || 2–0 ||align=left|Adrian Ramirez
|KO
|2 (4),  || Dec 8, 2008 ||align=left|
|align=left|
|- align=center
|1
|Win || 1–0 ||align=left|Alejandro Moreno
|KO
|2 (4),  || Nov 21, 2008 ||align=left|Salon Marbet Plus, Ciudad Nezahualcóyotl, Mexico
|align=left|

See also
List of bantamweight boxing champions
List of Japanese boxing world champions
Notable boxing families
Boxing in Japan

References

External links

Profile of Tomoki Kameda from Premier Boxing Champions website
Tomoki Kameda - Profile, News Archive & Current Rankings at Box.Live

1991 births
Living people
Bantamweight boxers
Super-bantamweight boxers
World bantamweight boxing champions
World Boxing Organization champions
Japanese expatriate sportspeople in Mexico
Japanese male boxers
Sportspeople from Osaka